Laurel station may refer to:

Places
Laurel Station, Ontario, a community in the township of Amaranth, Ontario

Stations
Laurel station (Mississippi), an Amtrak station in Laurel, Mississippi
Laurel (MARC station), a MARC station in Laurel, Maryland
Laurel (LIRR station), a former Long Island Rail Road station in Laurel, New York

See also
Laurel Race Track (MARC station)
Laurel House Railroad Station
Laurel Hill (LIRR station)